Facultative means "optional" or "discretionary" (antonym obligate), used mainly in biology in phrases such as:
 Facultative (FAC), facultative wetland (FACW), or facultative upland (FACU): wetland indicator statuses for plants
 Facultative anaerobe, an organism that can use oxygen but also has anaerobic methods of energy production. It can survive in either environment
 Facultative biotroph, an organism, often a fungus, that can live as a saprotroph but also form mutualisms with other organisms at different times of its life cycle.
 Facultative biped, an animal that is capable of walking or running on two legs as well as walking or running on four limbs or more, as appropriate
 Facultative carnivore, a carnivore that does not depend solely on animal flesh for food but also can subsist on non-animal food. Compare this with the term omnivore
 Facultative heterochromatin, tightly packed but non-repetitive DNA in the form of Heterochromatin, but which can lose its condensed structure and become transcriptionally active 
 Facultative lagoon, a type of stabilization pond used in biological treatment of industrial and domestic wastewater
 Facultative parasite, a parasite that can complete its life cycle without depending on a host
 Facultative photoperiodic plant, a plant that will eventually flower regardless of night length but is more likely to flower under appropriate light conditions.
 Facultative saprophyte, lives on dying, rather than dead, plant material
facultative virus

See also
(antonym) Obligate
Opportunism (Biology)

Biology terminology